The Bankia Madrid Masters was a European Tour golf tournament that was held for the first time in October 2008, taking the slot formerly used by the Open de Madrid. The 2011 event was held at the El Encín Golf Hotel.  In 2011, it was sponsored by the Spanish banking group, Bankia.  Bankia's financial problems resulted in the 2012 tournament being cancelled when a replacement sponsor could not be found.

Winners

References

External links 
Coverage on the European Tour's official site

Former European Tour events
Golf tournaments in Spain
Defunct sports competitions in Spain